The 1984 Australian Drivers' Championship was a CAMS sanctioned national motor racing title open to drivers of racing cars complying with Formula Mondial regulations.

The winner of the title, which was the 28th Australian Drivers' Championship, was awarded the 1984 CAMS Gold Star. John Bowe won the championship driving a Ralt RT4 Ford. It would be the first of two such titles for the Tasmanian driver. Finishing second in the championship was four-time defending champion Alfredo Costanzo in his Porsche Cars Australia team Tiga FA81 Ford, while the 1983 Australian Sports Car Champion Peter Hopwood driving his Ralt RT4 Ford finished in third place in his first full season of open wheel racing.

After finishing 4th and being the first resident Australian driver home in the non-championship 1984 Australian Grand Prix at Melbourne's Calder Park Raceway in November, Alfie Costanzo effectively retired from open wheel racing when his Porsche Cars Australia team boss Alan Hamilton closed the race team.

Calendar
The championship was contested over a seven-round series with each round held as a single race. Winton Raceway was originally intended to host the final round of the series on 14 October but that meeting was cancelled. Negotiations between track secretary Michael Ronke and CAMS saw the round re-instated to 2 months earlier than planned (12 August) becoming Round 4 instead of Round 7. This rescheduling ultimately cost Alfredo Costanzo any chance he had of successfully retaining his championship as he had booked business with Porsche in West Germany for the weekend of the rescheduled race. John Smith would take his place in the Tiga FA/83 for the race.

Points system
Championship points were awarded on a 9–6–4–3–2–1 basis to the top six classified finishers at each round.

Results

  *John Smith subbed for Costanzo at Round 4 due to Costanzo being in Germany

References

External links
 CAMS Manual of Motor Sport > About CAMS > Titles – CAMS Gold Star (Archived 2009-05-07)
 Australian openwheeler racing images – 1984
 Western Australian race results – 1984 

Australian Drivers' Championship
Drivers' Championship